The Zarautsoy Rock Paintings are a gallery of rock art contains the oldest petroglyphs in Central Asia. The images describe primitive man’s everyday life, and bull and wild goat hunting.  The site is located in the Surxondaryo Region of Uzbekistan.

World Heritage Status
This site was added to the UNESCO World Heritage Tentative List on 18 January 2008, in the Cultural category.

Notes

References
Zarautsoy Rock Paintings - UNESCO World Heritage Centre Retrieved 5 March 2009.

Rock art in Uzbekistan
Surxondaryo Region
World Heritage Tentative List